Gipps is a surname.  Notable people with the name include:

Caroline Gipps (born 1948), British academic and vice-chancellor of the University of Wolverhampton (2005–2011)
George Gipps (1791–1847), Governor of New South Wales, Australia
George Gipps (MP for Canterbury) (died 1800)
George Gipps (MP for Ripon), MP for Ripon in 1807
Henry Plumptre Gipps (1813–1859), MP for Canterbury
Reginald Gipps (1831–1908), British Army general and Military Secretary
Richard Gipps (1659–1708), English Master of the Revels and historian
Ruth Gipps (1921–1999), British composer
Tommy Gipps (1888–?), English footballer

See also

Simon Gipps-Kent (1958–1987), British actor
Gipp, a surname, including a list of people with the name